Anna Karolina Walfridsson Westberg (born 16 May 1978) is a former Swedish footballer who played as a defender for Malmö FF Dam, Umeå IK and the Swedish national team.

International career
Karolina Westberg featured for Sweden in three World Cups (USA 1999, USA 2003, China 2007) and two Olympic Games (Sydney 2000 Olympics, Athens 2004.) She was on the roster for the 2008 Beijing Olympics but did not appear in a match. Westberg played in three European Championship tournaments: Norway/Sweden 1997, Germany 2001, and England 2005.

Personal life
Westberg was born in Kristianstad, and now uses the surname Walfridsson Westberg.

References

External links
 Club Profile
 National Team Profile
 Article in Sydsvenskan
 Olympic Profile

Living people
1978 births
Swedish women's footballers
Olympic footballers of Sweden
Footballers at the 2008 Summer Olympics
Sweden women's international footballers
FIFA Century Club
Umeå IK players
Damallsvenskan players
2007 FIFA Women's World Cup players
Women's association football central defenders
2003 FIFA Women's World Cup players
1999 FIFA Women's World Cup players
People from Kristianstad Municipality
Footballers from Skåne County